Kriengsak Nukulsompratana (born 15 June 1948) is a Thai former footballer who competed in the 1968 Summer Olympics.

References

External links
 

1948 births
Living people
Kriengsak Nukulsompratana
Kriengsak Nukulsompratana
Footballers at the 1968 Summer Olympics
Southeast Asian Games medalists in football
Kriengsak Nukulsompratana
Association football forwards
Competitors at the 1969 Southeast Asian Peninsular Games
Kriengsak Nukulsompratana